Professor Rose-Marie Belle Antoine is a Trinidadian academic, attorney-at-law, author and Professor of Labor Law and Offshore Financial Law. She currently serves as the Pro-Vice-Chancellor of the Board for Graduate Studies and Research at The University of the West Indies. She previously served as regional Dean of the Faculty of Law, the first Dean of the Faculty of Law at St. Augustine, Deputy Dean (Outreach) of the Faculty of Law at St. Augustine from 2004 to 2009, senior lecturer from 1998-2004, lecturer in the Faculty of Law at Cave Hill from 1991-1998 and temporary lecturer in the Faculty of Law at Cave Hill from 1989-1991. She was inaugural Director of the LLM from 2000-2002.

In 2008 she was named as one of "60 under 60" distinguished academics at the University of the West Indies.  She has also served as an adjunct professor at Case Western Reserve University (2005-2009) and DePaul University (2010-2011). In 2013 she created history by becoming the only person to have won the regional Vice Chancellor's Award of Excellence, University of the West Indies twice, first in 2006 for Excellence in research and in 2013 for Excellence in Public Service.

She also serves as a Commissioner of the Inter-American Commission on Human Rights and was elected President of the Commission in 2015.

She works with a number of public and private bodies as a consultant, drafted several laws in the Caribbean, including the Labour Code of Saint Lucia and the CARICOM Harmonization of Labour Law Report.

Professor Belle Antoine was once mistakenly beaten and then arrested by police whilst trying to protect students at a student protest.

Education

Professor Antoine was a student and head girl at St. Joseph's Convent, St. Joseph, Trinidad. She subsequently obtained a Bachelor of Laws degree at University of West Indies, where she was the Irvine Hall valedictorian. She then obtained a Master of Laws degree at University of Cambridge, where she was a Pegasus Scholar, and a Doctor of Philosophy degree in law at the University of Oxford.

Private practice

Professor Antoine is a partner in the law firm, Anthony & Antoine, a specialist human rights and administrative law firm, a position she has held since 2006.

Published works

Selected published works include:

 Confidentiality in Offshore Financial Law, Oxford University Press.
 Trusts and Tax in Offshore Financial Law, Oxford University Press.
 Law and Legal Systems, Cavendish publishing.
 Unfair Dismissal Digest, ILO
 Legal Issues in Offshore Finance

References

Living people
Alumni of Balliol College, Oxford
University of the West Indies alumni
University of the West Indies academics
Fellows of Lady Margaret Hall, Oxford
English legal scholars
Year of birth missing (living people)
Place of birth missing (living people)